Harrisville, Mississippi (zip code 39082; area code 601) is a small unincorporated community located south of Florence, Mississippi, about 25 miles from the state capital, Jackson.

Located in Simpson County, Mississippi, Harrisville sits mainly at the junction between Highway 469, which connects to Florence and Pinola, and Highway 540, which connects to D'Lo. The community is part of the Jackson Metropolitan Statistical Area. The two main churches are the Harrisville United Methodist Church and the Harrisville Baptist Church.

References

Unincorporated communities in Mississippi
Unincorporated communities in Simpson County, Mississippi
Jackson metropolitan area, Mississippi